The Po River District Basin Authority—formerly the Po River Basin Authority (Autorità di bacino del fiume Po) and abbreviated AdbPo—is a statutory corporation responsible for the maintenance of the Po river and tributaries in Italy's sovereign territory. Established via decree on 18 May 1989, the public body is a  sponsored by the Ministry of Ecological Transition. It was declared a basin authority on 25 October 2016 by the erstwhile Ministry for Environment, Land and Sea Protection.

References

External links 

Organizations established in 1989
1989 establishments in Italy